Creußen is a river of Bavaria, Germany. It flows into the Haidenaab near Grafenwöhr.

See also
List of rivers of Bavaria

References

Rivers of Bavaria
Bayreuth (district)
Neustadt an der Waldnaab (district)
Rivers of Germany